Débora Torreira (born 8 January 1990) is a Dominican team handball player. She plays for the club Liberbank Gijón, and on the Dominican Republic national team. She competed at the 2013 World Women's Handball Championship in Serbia, where the Dominican Republic placed 23rd.

References

1991 births
Living people
Dominican Republic female  handball players
Sportspeople from Santo Domingo
Spanish people of Dominican Republic descent
Sportspeople of Dominican Republic descent
Expatriate handball players
Dominican Republic expatriate sportspeople in Spain
Pan American Games bronze medalists for the Dominican Republic
Pan American Games medalists in handball
Handball players at the 2011 Pan American Games
Handball players at the 2019 Pan American Games
Medalists at the 2011 Pan American Games
20th-century Dominican Republic women
21st-century Dominican Republic women